Tourism in Turkey is focused largely on a variety of historical sites, and on seaside resorts along its Aegean and Mediterranean Sea coasts. Turkey has also become a popular destination for culture, spa, and health care.

At its height in 2019, Turkey attracted around 51 million foreign tourists, ranking as the sixth-most-popular tourist destination in the world. The total number fluctuated between around 41 million in 2015, and around 30 million in 2016. However, recovery began in 2017, with the number of foreign visitors increasing to 37.9 million, and in 2018 to 46.1 million visitors

Destinations

Istanbul

Istanbul is one of the most important tourist spots not only in Turkey but also in the world. There are thousands of hotels and other tourist-oriented industries in the city. Turkey's largest city, Istanbul has a number of major attractions derived from its historical status as the capital of the Byzantine and Ottoman Empires. These include the Sultan Ahmed Mosque (the "Blue Mosque"), the Hagia Sophia, the Topkapı Palace, the Basilica Cistern, the Dolmabahçe Palace, the Galata Tower, the Grand Bazaar, the Spice Bazaar, and the Pera Palace Hotel. Istanbul has also recently become one of the biggest shopping centers of the European region by hosting malls and shopping centers, such as MetroCity, Akmerkez and Cevahir Mall, which is the biggest mall in Europe and seventh largest shopping center in the world. Other attractions include sporting events, museums, and cultural events.

In January 2013, the Turkish government announced that it would build the world's largest airport in Istanbul. The operation has an invested 7-billion euros and was planned to have the first part of a four-part plan completed by 2017.

As a consequence of the continuous fall in tourism to Turkey in recent years, as of October 2016 in Istanbul's famous bazaar once crowded shopping streets are not as crowded as before, "the streams of tourists who used to visit the market each day have trickled to a halt". The number of foreign tourists visiting Istanbul declined to 9.2  million in 2016, a 26 percent decrease compared to 2015.

Ankara 
Ankara, the capital of Turkey, is the second most populated city in Turkey.  It is rich with Turkish history and culture that have roots in the founding of Turkey along with the history of ancient civilizations. The most popular landmark is the Anıtkabir as it has visitors from all around the country and the world, especially during national holidays. The Anıtkabir is a mausoleum for Atatürk, the founder of the Republic of Turkey. Another landmark would be the Museum of Anatolian Civilizations, a museum that possesses works from Paleolithic, Neolithic, Hatti, Hittite, Phrygian, Urartian, and Roman civilizations.

Izmir 
Izmir is a city with historical and geopolitical importance in ancient civilizations such as Macedonia, Persia, Lydia, and the Ottomans. The city has a memorable history in the early years of Turkey as it was the main city that was affected by the Greco-Turkish War (1919–1922). Izmir is home to many ancient cities such as Ephesus, Pergamon, and Klazomenai. Besides historical significance, Izmir also possesses many locations for coastal tourism for international travelers. Frequently visited regions that have tourist beaches for local and international tourists would be Çeşme, Mordoğan, and Foça.

Other destinations

Beach vacations and Blue Cruises, particularly for Turkish delights and visitors from Western Europe, are also central to the Turkish tourism industry. Most beach resorts are located along the southwestern and southern coast, called the Turkish Riviera, especially along the Mediterranean coast near Antalya. Antalya is also accepted as the tourism capital of Turkey. Major resort towns include Bodrum, Fethiye, Marmaris, Kuşadası, Didim and Alanya. Also, Turkey has been chosen second in the world in 2015 with its 436 blue-flagged beaches, according to the Chamber of Shipping.

Attractions elsewhere in the country include the sites of Ephesus, Troy, Pergamon, House of the Virgin Mary, Pamukkale, Hierapolis, Trabzon (where one of the oldest monasteries is the Sümela Monastery), Konya (where the poet Rumi had spent most of his life), Didyma, Church of Antioch, ancient Pontic capital and king rock tombs with its acropolis in Amasya, religious places in Mardin (such as Deyrülzafarân Monastery), and the ruined cities and landscapes of Cappadocia.

Diyarbakır is also an important historic city, although tourism is on a relatively small level due to waning armed conflicts.

Gallipoli and Anzac Cove – a small cove on the Gallipoli peninsula, which became known as the site of World War I landing of the ANZAC (Australian and New Zealand Army Corps) on 25 April 1915. Following the landing at Anzac Cove, the beach became the main base for the Australian and New Zealand troops for the eight months of the Gallipoli campaign.

UNESCO World Heritage Sites 
As of 2021, Turkey accommodates 19 UNESCO World Heritage Sites, 17 cultural and 2 mixed. The last addition is Arslantepe being added in 2021.

Göbekli Tepe 
Göbekli Tepe is a historical site that dates back to the Pre-Pottery Neolithic age. The site possesses megalithic structures that were composed of massive stone pillars that were detailed with anthropological details, clothing, and wild animals. The structures give insights into the lifestyles of hunter-gatherers that date back to 11,500 years ago. It is theorized that the site was created with religious intent as a sanctuary whilst more recent findings show the existence of domestic buildings that were used for rain collection and harvesting.

Archaeological site of Troy 
Troy is an archeological world heritage site that was added to the list in 1998. The site dates back 4000 years. Troy showcases the cultural development of ancient Greece as it is a recurring city in ancient Greek literature. In the area, many historical and archeological sites can be found such as burial mounds, cemeteries, settlements, and monuments that are linked to the ancient Greeks, Romans, and Ottomans.

Medical tourism 
An emerging branch of tourism in Turkey is medical tourism. Commonly performed medical procedures are hair transplant operations, rhinoplasty and cosmetic dentistry as it draws in thousands of foreigner tourists every year. In 2021, the revenue generated from medical tourism was given as $1.05 billion with 642,000 people that visited for the purpose of getting medical service. This is due to Turkey offering high-quality clinics for affordable pricing compared to the rest of Europe and its central location between Asia and Europe. Other reasons for the high demand for healthcare in Turkey are foreigners having easy visa procedures and immediate scheduling for operations.

Development of tourism 

Most tourist arrivals in Turkey come from the following countries:
 

 

Foreign tourist arrivals increased substantially in Turkey between 2000 and 2005, from 8 million to 25 million, which made Turkey a top-10 destination in the world for foreign visitors. 2005 revenues were  billion which also made Turkey one of the top-10 biggest revenue owners in the world. In 2011, Turkey ranked as the 6th most popular tourist destination in the world and 4th in Europe, according to UNWTO World Tourism barometer. See World Tourism rankings. At its height in 2014, Turkey attracted around 42 million foreign tourists, still ranking as the 6th most popular tourist destination in the world. From 2015, tourism to Turkey entered a steep decline. In 2016, only around 30 million people visited Turkey. 2016 is described as the second year of huge losses on both visitor numbers and income, a "year of devastating losses", with Turkish tourism businesses stating that they "cannot remember a worse time in the sector". The number of foreign visitors started recovering in 2017 with 37.9 million visitors being recorded. The recovery was partly due to intense security campaigns and advertising. The number of Russian tourists increased by 444% after the recovery of bilateral relations, resulting in Russia becoming the top tourism market for Turkey once again. Increases were also recorded in the British, Dutch and Belgian markets.

In early 2017, the Turkish government urged Turkish citizens living abroad to take their vacations in Turkey, attempting to revive the struggling tourism sector of an economy that went into contraction from late 2016. After the April 2017 constitutional referendum, another sharp drop in tourist bookings from Germany was recorded. In 2018, however, the German Tourism Industry Association recorded a growth in German tourist bookings for Turkey, with a 70% increase being recorded by the TUI Group alone.

Government policy and regulation 
The AKP government has been promoting "halal tourism" for years, politically reaffirming this stance over the course of 2016. In March 2017, a Turkish court banned global travel fare aggregator website Booking.com from offering services to Turkish tourists for lack of a national licence, while the Hoteliers Association of Turkey campaigns for a lifting the ban of the enterprise on which its members relied for up to 90 percent of their turnover. In April 2017, the police department of the prime resort city of Antalya issued a directive banning the consumption of alcohol outside of buildings.

Sex tourism

	
Prostitution  is legal and regulated in Turkey. The secularization of Turkish society allowed prostitution to achieve legal status during the early 20th century. Sex tourism has been part of Turkey's tourism industry and has been growing over the decades both for foreigners and locals. Many foreigners come to Turkey to work for local Turks in the prostitution business, while many Turks travel abroad as consumers of sex tourism, mostly to Eastern Europe for the purpose. Anyone who encourages someone to commit prostitution, facilitates it, or mediates or provides a place for prostitution is punished with imprisonment from two to four years and a judicial fine of up to three thousand days.

Covid-19 Pandemic 
During the Covid-19 pandemic, the number of tourists arriving in Turkey declined to around 16 million in 2020. This was the lowest number of tourists in the last decade. The revenue from international travel was reduced to $13.7 billion which only made up 1.91% of the total economy in 2020. In 2021, Turkey's tourism recovered from the pandemic as it contributed $59.3 billion to the GDP, which made up 7.3% of the total economy.

Gallery

See also
 List of archaeological sites by country#Turkey
 Ministry of Culture and Tourism (Turkey)
 Museums in Turkey
 Visa policy of Turkey
 List of national parks of Turkey
 List of national parks of Turkey

References
Requirements for Urgent Visa for Turkey

Further reading

External links

 

 
Turkey
Turkey